A by-election was held for the Australian House of Representatives seat of Cook on 21 May 1955. This was triggered by the death of Labor MP Tom Sheehan.

The by-election was won by Labor candidate Jim Cope. The governing Liberal Party did not nominate a candidate, which resulted in Cope receiving over 85% of the first preference vote.

Results

References

1955 elections in Australia
New South Wales federal by-elections